Cheng Chang-Ming (born 28 January 1978) is a Taiwanese baseball player who competed in the 2004 Summer Olympics.

References

1978 births
Living people
Asian Games bronze medalists for Chinese Taipei
Asian Games medalists in baseball
Asian Games silver medalists for Chinese Taipei
Baseball players at the 2004 Summer Olympics
Baseball players at the 1998 Asian Games
Baseball players at the 2002 Asian Games
Baseball shortstops
Chinatrust Whales players
Koos Group Whales players
Medalists at the 1998 Asian Games
Medalists at the 2002 Asian Games
Olympic baseball players of Taiwan
People from Taitung County
Taiwanese baseball players